Susan Diana Caird (born 24 November 1958) is a New Zealand former cricketer who played as a right-handed batter. She appeared in four One Day Internationals for New Zealand in 1984. She played domestic cricket for Central Districts, Wellington and North Shore.

References

External links
 
 

1958 births
Living people
Cricketers from Christchurch
New Zealand women cricketers
New Zealand women One Day International cricketers
Central Districts Hinds cricketers
Wellington Blaze cricketers
North Shore women cricketers